Cha In-pyo (born October 14, 1967) is a South Korean actor and director.

Early life 
Cha graduated from Rutgers University in the U.S. with a degree in economics. His father ran a shipping company and had intended for Cha to take over the family business.

Career 
Cha had dreamed of becoming an actor since he was a teenager, so he auditioned for General's Son, but at the recommendation of his parents, he went to the U.S. with his mother to study. After working at Hanjin Shipping for several years, he quit his job to pursue acting full-time. In 1993 he joined MBC and made his debut in the television series Under the Same Roof (ko) before enlisting and completing his mandatory military service. His major breakthrough came in the 1997 television series Star in My Heart, one of the first Korean dramas to be broadcast overseas and widely acknowledged to be the "first generation" of the Korean Wave, earning him public recognition. In 2004 he starred in the SBS romantic-mystery drama Hong Kong Express. While the drama did not garner as much attention, the scene in which his character expresses his rage by furiously brushing his teeth in front of the bathroom mirror became iconic and was often parodied by comedians or used as a meme on Korean variety shows to indicate silent rage. Cha later stated on Cultwo Show that the scene was not in his script since the only direction he received was "expressing anger in the bathroom".

Cha has since garnered an extensive filmography in both film and television, including Crossing which was South Korea's entry for the 81st Academy Awards for Best Foreign Language Film and earned him several nominations for various awards. He has also collaborated with Korean-American director Benson Lee in the period drama-comedy indie film Seoul Searching, which was screened at the 2015 Sundance Film Festival and features a diverse cast and crew drawn from the worldwide overseas Japanese, Chinese and Korean diaspora. He returned to network television in the weekend drama The Gentlemen of Wolgyesu Tailor Shop, which drew ratings of over 30% for much of its run and earned him nominations at the 2016 KBS Drama Awards.

Personal life 
Cha met his future wife, co-star Shin Ae-ra, on the set of the drama Love in Your Heart (ko) and they married in March 1995 prior to his enlistment. As two of the top television stars of the 1990s, their marriage received extensive media coverage and was one of the most reported events of the year. They have a son and two daughters. Their decision to adopt their daughters was met with praise, especially given the rarity of adoptions by local Korean families compared to overseas families.

Philanthropy 
On July 22, 2022, Cha donated 10 million won to treat a baby with stage 3 cancer from Uzbekistan through All That Medi.

In December 2022, Cha donated 50 million won to Yana (You Are Not Alone), a support group for young people preparing for self-reliance.

Filmography

Television series

Films

Web shows

MC 
 Jongno Photo Studio (2022) - Host; Chuseok's special 
 Bistro Shigor (2021) - head chef
  Fireman Boy  (Cast Member , 2021)
 Environmental Special (007)
 Blackbox (KBS, 2002)
 Love for Three Days (co-host, Park Cheol) (iTV, 1998)

Music videos
 Forgiveness (용서, Cho Jang-hyuk, 2001)
 Sad... (Cho Jang-hyuk, 2001)
 Forever (영원, Sky, 1999)

Discography 
 "Heart Fire" (心火, Xin Huo) - The Four Detective Guards opening theme song (2004) 
 "Dream" (梦, Meng) - The Four Detective Guards ending theme song (2004)

Novels 
 Cha, In-pyo. (2011). Today's Forecast. Hainaim (해냄출판사). .
 Cha, In-pyo. (2009). Goodbye, Hill. Sallim (살림). .

Awards

References

External links 
 
 https://web.archive.org/web/20081205145407/http://www.inpyosarang.net/ 
 Cha In-pyo at HanCinema

South Korean novelists
South Korean television presenters
South Korean male television actors
South Korean male film actors
South Korean male models
Male actors from Seoul
1967 births
Living people
Rutgers University alumni